The 2005–06 Greek Football Cup was the 64th edition of the Greek Football Cup, competition. This season's edition was the first to be entitled "SINCO Greek Cup" after SINCO Insurance Brokers. The competition started on 20 August 2005 and concluded on 10 May 2006 with the Final, held at Pankritio Stadium. Olympiacos won the trophy with a 3-0 victory over AEK Athens.

Calendar

Knockout phase
Each tie in the knockout phase, apart from the quarter-finals and the semi-finals, was played by a single match. If the score was level at the end of normal time, extra time was played, followed by a penalty shoot-out if the score was still level. In the quarter-finals and the semi-finals were played over two legs, with each team playing one leg at home. The team that scored more goals on aggregate over the two legs advanced to the next round. If the aggregate score was level, the away goals rule was applied, i.e. the team that scored more goals away from home over the two legs advanced. If away goals were also equal, then extra time was played. The away goals rule was again applied after extra time, i.e. if there were goals scored during extra time and the aggregate score was still level, the visiting team advanced by virtue of more away goals scored. If no goals were scored during extra time, the winners were decided by a penalty shoot-out. In the round of 16, if the score was level at the end of normal time the two-legged rule was applied.The mechanism of the draws for each round is as follows:
In the draw for the second round, the teams from the second division are seeded and the winners from the first round were unseeded. The seeded teams are drawn against the unseeded teams.
In the draw for the third round, the teams from the first division are seeded and the winners from the second round were unseeded. The seeded teams are drawn against the unseeded teams.
In the draws for the Round of 32 onwards, there are no seedings and teams from the different group can be drawn against each other.

Qualifying round
The draw took place on 11 August 2005.

Summary

|-
|colspan="3" style="background-color:#D0D0D0" align=center|21 August 2005

|}

Matches

First round
The draw took place on 11 August 2005.

Summary

|-
|colspan="3" style="background-color:#D0D0D0" align=center|20 August 2005

|-
|colspan="3" style="background-color:#D0D0D0" align=center|21 August 2005

|-
|colspan="3" style="background-color:#D0D0D0" align=center|24 August 2005

|}

Matches

Second round
The draw took place on 11 August 2005, after the First Round draw.

Summary

|-
|colspan="3" style="background-color:#D0D0D0" align=center|31 August 2005

|-
|colspan="3" style="background-color:#D0D0D0" align=center|1 September 2005

|}

Matches

Bracket

Round of 32
The draw took place on 11 August 2005.

Summary

|}

Matches

Round of 16
The draw took place on 18 November 2005.

Summary

||colspan="2" 

||colspan="2" rowspan="4" 

|}

Matches

Replay

Quarter-finals
The draw took place on 18 November 2005, after the Round of 16 draw.

Summary

|}

Matches

AEK Athens won 2–0 on aggregate.

Olympiacos won 2–1 on aggregate.

Agrotikos Asteras won 5–1 on aggregate.

AEL won 2–0 on aggregate.

Semi-finals
The draw took place on 18 November 2005, after the quarter-final draw.

Summary

|}

Matches

AEK Athens won 3–1 on aggregate.

Olympiacos won 4–1 on aggregate.

Final

References

External links
Greek Cup 2005-2006 at RSSSF
Greek Cup 2005-2006 at Hellenic Football Federation's official site

Greek Football Cup seasons
Greek Cup
Cup